Jens Braage Halvorsen (7 March 1845 – 22 February 1900) was a Norwegian librarian, magazine editor and literary historian.

Halvorsen was born in Bergen, Norway. In 1866, he relocated to Christiania (now Oslo). He edited the magazine Ny Illustreret Tidende from 1880 to 1883. He is particularly known for his principal work, the encyclopedia of Norwegian writers, Norsk forfatterlexikon, which was issued from 1881 until his death. The encyclopedia was finished in 1908 by  Halvdan Koht. Halvorsen was Norwegian editor for the first edition of the encyclopedia  Salmonsens Konversations-Lexikon.

He was decorated Knight of the Royal Norwegian Order of St. Olav in 1896.

References

1845 births
1900 deaths
Writers from Bergen
Norwegian literary historians
Norwegian encyclopedists
Norwegian librarians
Norwegian magazine editors
19th-century Norwegian journalists
Male journalists
19th-century Norwegian writers
19th-century Norwegian male writers